The 2013 UEFA Women's Champions League Final was the final match of the 2012–13 UEFA Women's Champions League, the 12th season of the UEFA Women's Champions League football tournament and the fourth since it was renamed from the UEFA Women's Cup. The match was held at Stamford Bridge in London on 23 May 2013. Wolfsburg won the tournament, surprisingly beating Lyon 1–0 to make their first cup victory.

Lyon played the final for the fourth consecutive time. It also marked the fourth time in a row that a French and a German club met in the final.

Route to the final

Match details

Statistics

References

Uefa Women's Champions League Final 2013
2013
2012–13 UEFA Women's Champions League
Uefa
uefa
May 2013 sports events in the United Kingdom
Uefa Women's Champions League Final 2013
Uefa Women's Champions League Final 2013